The Northwest Energy Efficiency Alliance (NEEA) is a non-profit organization working to accelerate energy efficiency in the Pacific Northwest through the acceleration and adoption of energy-efficient products, services and practices. NEEA is supported by and works in partnership with more than 140 Northwest utilities, the Bonneville Power Administration and Energy Trust of Oregon. NEEA's efforts serve Idaho, Montana, Oregon and Washington.

History 
In the mid-1990s, with energy efficiency programs at risk of being stranded by deregulation, the Northwest Power and Conservation Council called for the creation of a regional organization to encourage energy efficiency practices. NEEA was incorporated as a non-profit corporation in the fall of 1996 with funding from all investor-owned utilities in the region and the Bonneville Power Administration, which represented publicly owned utilities. In order to ensure the necessary collaboration would take place, the first Board represented all of the primary stakeholders including regulators from the four states, public and privately owned utilities, energy efficiency businesses, and representatives for the four state governments.

Since 1997, the region, in collaboration with NEEA, has saved enough energy to power more than 900,000 homes each year from their energy efficiency efforts.

Funders 
Avista Utilities
Bonneville Power Administration
Cascade Natural Gas
Clark Public Utilities
Chelan PUD
Cowlitz County PUD
Energy Trust of Oregon
Idaho Power
NorthWestern Energy
NW Natural
Pacific Power
 Portland General Electric
Puget Sound Energy
Seattle City Light
Snohomish County PUD
Tacoma Power

References

External links 
 Northwest Energy Efficiency Alliance website

Environmental organizations based in the United States
Energy conservation in the United States